is an arena in Maebashi, Japan. With a capacity of 8,000, it is primarily used for indoor sports. One of its primary functions is as a velodrome - when it is known as  - holding parimutuel Keirin races throughout the year.

Some of the international sports meets held in the past include the 1990 UCI Track Cycling World Championships and the 1999 IAAF World Indoor Championships. It is the former home arena of the Gunma Crane Thunders of the B.League, Japan's professional basketball league.

Professional Keirin

The Dome's velodrome oval is 335 meters in circumference. A typical keirin race of 2,035 meters consists of six laps around the course.

Green Dome Maebashi is one of only two indoor locations in Japan that offer professional keirin races - the other venue is Kokura Velodrome at the Kitakyushu Media Dome.

Maebashi's keirin identification number for betting purposes is 22# (22 sharp).

Naming rights
Takasaki-based Yamada Denki purchased the naming rights in 2014,

See also 
 List of indoor arenas in Japan

References

External links

Green Dome Maebashi Home Page (Japanese)
 Green Dome Maebashi

Basketball venues in Japan
Gunma Crane Thunders
Indoor arenas in Japan
Velodromes in Japan
Cycle racing in Japan
Indoor track and field venues
Sports venues in Gunma Prefecture
Maebashi
1990 establishments in Japan
Sports venues completed in 1990